The following were the events of Volleyball for the year 2014 throughout the world.

Beach volleyball
 April 22 – December 14: 2014 FIVB Beach Volleyball World Tour
 April 22 – December 14: Open Tournaments
 April 22 – 27 in  Fuzhou
 Winners:  Paolo Nicolai & Daniele Lupo (m) /  Kerri Walsh Jennings & April Ross (f)
 May 6 – 11 in  Puerto Vallarta
 Winners:  Aleksandrs Samoilovs & Jānis Šmēdiņš (m) /  Agatha Bednarczuk & Bárbara Seixas (f)
 May 21 – 25 in  Prague (women teams only)
 Winners:  Kristýna Kolocová & Markéta Sluková
 May 27 – June 1 in  Anapa
 Winners:  Mārtiņš Pļaviņš & Aleksandrs Solovejs (m) /  Victoria Bieneck & Julia Großner (f)
 October 7 – 12 in  Xiamen
 Winners:  Youssef Krou & Edouard Rowlandson (m) /  Juliana Silva & Maria Antonelli (f)
 October 28 – November 2 in  Paraná
 Winners:  Josh Binstock & Sam Schachter (m) /  Larissa França & Talita Antunes (f)
 November 4 – 8 in  Doha (men only)
 Winners:  Tim Holler & Jonas Schröder
 November 5 – 9 in  Pattaya (women only)
 Winners:  Miller Elwin & Linline Matauatu
 December 9 – 14 in  Bloemfontein (final)
 Winners:  Reinder Nummerdor & Christiaan Varenhorst (m) /  Martina Bonnerová & Barbora Hermannová (f) 
 April 29 – September 28: Grand Slam Tournaments
 April 29 – May 4 in  Shanghai
 Winners:  Paolo Nicolai & Daniele Lupo (m) /  Laura Ludwig & Kira Walkenhorst (f)
 June 11 – 15 in  Moscow
 Winners:  Konstantin Semenov & Viacheslav Krasilnikov (m) /  April Ross & Kerri Walsh (f)
 June 17 – 22 in  Berlin
 Winners:  John Hyden & Tri Bourne (m) /  Kristýna Kolocová & Markéta Sluková (f)
 June 24 – 29 in  Stavanger
 Winners:  Phil Dalhausser & Sean Rosenthal (m) /  April Ross & Kerri Walsh (f)
 July 8 – 13 in  Gstaad
 Winners:  Phil Dalhausser & Sean Rosenthal (m) /  Katrin Holtwick & Ilka Semmler (f)
 July 15 – 20 in  The Hague
 Winners:  Grzegorz Fijałek & Mariusz Prudel (m) /  Taiana Lima & Fernanda Alves (f)
 July 22 – 27 in  Long Beach, California
 Winners:  Phil Dalhausser & Sean Rosenthal (m) /  April Ross & Kerri Walsh (f)
 July 29 – August 3 in  Klagenfurt
 Winners:  Alison Cerutti & Bruno Oscar Schmidt (m) /  Larissa França & Talita Antunes (f)
 August 19 – 24 in  Stare Jabłonki
 Winners:  Pedro Solberg Salgado & Álvaro Morais Filho (m) /  Larissa França & Talita Antunes (f)
 September 23 – 28 in  São Paulo (final)
 Winners:  Christiaan Varenhorst & Reinder Nummerdor (m) /  Larissa França & Talita Antunes (f)
 June 3 – 8: 2014 European Beach Volleyball Championships in  Cagliari
 Men's winners:  Paolo Nicolai and Daniele Lupo
 Women's winners:  Madelein Meppelink and Marleen van Iersel
 June 5 – 8: 2014 Asian Beach Volleyball Championship in  Jinjiang
 Men's winners:  Isaac Kapa and Christopher McHugh
 Women's winners:  Louise Bawden and Taliqua Clancy
 June 10 – 15: 2014 FIVB U23 World Championships in  Masłowice
 Winners:  Maciej Kosiak & Maciej Rudol (m) /  Nicole Laird & Mariafe Artacho (f)
 July 15 – 20: 2014 FIVB U17 World Championships in  Acapulco
 Winners:  Yves Haussener & Florian Breer (m) /  Morgan Martin & Kathryn Plummer (f)
 July 23 – 27: 2014 FIVB U21 World Championships in  Larnaca
 Winners:  Michal Bryl & Kacper Kujawiak (m) /  Sophie Bukovec & Tiadora Miric (f)
 July 29 – August 3: 2014 FIVB U19 World Championships in  Porto
 Winners:  Arthur Diego Mariano Lanci & George Souto Maior Wanderley (m) /  Eduarda Santos Lisboa & Andressa Cavalcanti Ramalho (f)
 August 17 – 27: 2014 Summer Youth Olympics
 Boys:   Oleg Stoyanovskiy / Artem Iarzutkin;   Rolando Hernandez / Jose Gregorio Gomez;   Leandro Nicolas Aveiro / Santiago Karim Aulisi
 Girls:   Eduarda Santos Lisboa / Ana Patricia Silva Ramos;   Megan and Nicole McNamara;   Sarah Schneider / Lisa Arnholdt

Volleyball
 January 3 – October 25: 2014 FIVB Volleyball Schedule
 October 22, 2013 – March 16, 2014: 2013–14 CEV Women's Champions League
  Dinamo Kazan defeated  VakıfBank İstanbul 3–0, to claim its first title. The bronze medal went to  Rabita Baku.
 October 22, 2013 – March 23, 2014: 2013–14 CEV Champions League
  Belogorie Belgorod defeated  Halkbank Ankara 3–1.  Jastrzębski Węgiel took third place.
 May 5 – 10: 2014 FIVB Volleyball Men's Club World Championship in  Belo Horizonte
  Belogorie Belgorod defeated  Al-Rayyan, 3–1, to claim its first title. UPCN San Juan took third place.
 May 7 – 11: 2014 FIVB Volleyball Women's Club World Championship in  Zürich
  Dinamo Kazan defeated  Molico Osasco, 3–0, to claim its first title.
 May 23 – July 20: 2014 FIVB Volleyball World League for Men in 
  defeated , 3–1 (in matches won), to claim its second FIVB World League title.  took third place.
 July 25 – August 24: 2014 FIVB World Grand Prix for Women
 August 15 & 16: Group 2 Finals in  Koszalin
 August 16 & 17: Group 3 Finals in  Samokov
 August 20 – 24: Main Group 1 Finals in  Tokyo
  took first place (13 points) and won its tenth World Grand Prix title. Host nation, took second place (12 points).  took third place (7 points and higher points ratio).
 August 30 – September 21: 2014 FIVB Volleyball Men's World Championship in 
 Host nation, defeated , 3–1 in matches, to claim its second FIVB Men's World Championship title.  took the bronze medal.
 September 23 – October 12: 2014 FIVB Women's Volleyball World Championship in 
 The  defeated , 3–1 in matches, to claim its first FIVB Women's World Championship title.  won the bronze medal.

Volleyball Hall of Fame
Class of 2014: 
Nalbert Bitencourt
Tara Cross-Battle
Sandra Pires
Rosa Salikhova
Joop Alberda

References

 
 
Volleyball by year